Jean-François Garreaud (1 April 1946 – 9 July 2020) was a French actor.

Biography
Born to a father from Dordogne and a mother from Ardennes, Garreaud became an apprentice tiler at age fourteen. In 1968, he became an accountant for a restaurant, where he learned of the acting industry. His best-known role is that of Jean Dabin in Violette Nozière, released in 1978.

Garreaud married actress Virginie Ogouz, with whom he had two children. He died in Saint-Jory-de-Chalais on 9 July 2020 at the age of 74.

Filmography

Cinema

Feature films

Le Pied! (1974)
Per amore (1976) - Jean - Marina's brother
Va voir maman, papa travaille (1978)
Violette Nazière (1978) - Jean Dabin
A Simple Story (1978) - Christian
Mais ou et donc Ornicar (1979) - Jérôme, le médecin
La Isla de las cabezas (1979) - Pierre
I as in Icarus (1979) - Vernon Calbert
Brigade mondaine: Vaudou aux Caraïbes (1980) - Bertil
Les Filles de Grenoble (1981) - L'Inspecteur Imbert
Si ma gueule vous plaît (1981) - L'homme traqué
Guy de Maupassant (1982) - L'homme de la plage
Le Battant (1983) - Pradier
Si elle dit oui... je ne dis pas non (1983) - Thierry
Baby Cat (1983) - Peter Romeux
Blessure (1985) - Le big boss
Le Voyage à Paimpol (1985) - Jean-François
Le Test (1987) - Richard
Qui sont mes juges? (1987)
Betty (1992) - Mario
Le Fusil de bois (1994) - Morin
Une journée de merde! (1999) - René, le père de Sabine
Au loin... l'horizon (2002)
Contre-enquête (2007) - Salinas
Skate or Die (2008) - Robert
Ne nous soumets pas à la tentation (2011) - Tristan / Husband
Je m'appelle Hmmm... (2013) - Le délateur
All About Mothers (2018)
Le Calendrier (2020)

Short films
Claustro (1984) - Joël
La Nuit de Santa-Claus (1985) - Gabriel
Inutile de crier (1987) - Pierlot's friend
Rossignol de mes amours (1991)
Bons baisers de Suzanne (1995)
Omaha Beach (1996)
Santa (1999)
Point mort (2000)
Tea Time (2000) - Léo
Le Puits (2001) - Le commandant
Liquide (2004)
L'Enfant borne (2007) - Homme
Police matinale (2010) - Tony
Les Comptes d'Émile (2015)

Telefilms

La Substitution (1973) - Terence
Le Bon samaritain (1974) - Le garçon
La Dame de l'aube (1975) - Un garçon
La Pêche miraculeuse (1976) - Paul de Villars (1976)
La Ville, la nuit (1979) - Paul, le taxi
L'Éclaircie (1979) - Éric Legoff
L'Aéropostale, courrier du ciel (1980) - Jules Pranville
Le Carton rouge (1980) - Grota
Quatre femmes, quatre vies (1981) - Baptiste
Vincente (1985) - Chabert
Le Seul Témoin (1985) - Rémy
Un aventurier nommé Godin (1985) - Jean-Baptiste Godin
Bajazet (1985)
Bing (1986) - Bing
L'Affaire Saint-Romans (1988) - Germain Saint-Romans
La Comtesse de Charny (1989) - Joseph Balsamo
Les Cavaliers aux yeux verts (1990) - Elie Rouch
L'Héritère (1991) - Raynald
Une partie en trop (1993) - Pavel
Chasseur de loups (1994) - Warin
La Colline aux mille enfants (1994) - Robert Vitrac
Le Cri coupé (1994) - Claude
Meurtres par procuration (1995) - Cyril Mandel
Regards d'enfance: Les Faux-frères (1995) - Serge
Paroles d'enfant (1996) - Simon Gaspart
Les Allumettes suédoises (1996) - André Privat
Barrage sur l'Orénoque (1996) - Moperand
Le Corps d'un homme (1997)
Langevin: le secret (1997) - Gilles Langevin
Une femme d'action (1997) - Éric
L'Assassin pleurait (1998)
Drôle de père (1998) - Richard Travisse
La Spirale (1998)
Le Porteur de destins (1999) - Henri Chèze
Erreur médicale (1999) - Professeur Dutertre
La Bicyclette bleue (2000) - Commissaire Poinsot
Fabio Montale (2002) - Pierre Ugolini, dit 'Ugo'
Perlasca: Un eroe italiano (2002) - Professor
La Victoire des vaincus (2002) - M. Marguet
Jeanne Poisson, marquise de Pompadour (2006) - M. Marguet
L'Affaire Villemin (2006) - Le ministre
Premier suspect (2006) - Hadrien Archambault
La Lance de la destinée (2007) - Henri Mandel
Drôle de Noël! (2008) - Clodius
Blanche Maupas (2009) - Le Maire
L'internat (2009)
Malevil (2010) - Arbaud de Tréguy
Jeu de dames (2012) - Commissionnaire divisionnaire
Les Années perdues (2015) - André Jaeger

Dubbing
Apocalypse Now (1979)

References

1946 births
2020 deaths
French male actors